The TVS Apache (/əˈpætʃi/) is a brand of motorcycle made by TVS Motors since 2006. As of 2020, more than 4 million Apaches are on the road. Currently the company sells five variants of the TVS Apache. The differences between each variant being the engine displacement, the options on offer and performance characteristics. The abbreviation 'RTR' in the names of the motorcycles refer to 'Racing Throttle Response'.

History 
TVS which partnered with Suzuki for 19 years had brought out several two-stroke motorcycles in India. When the emission norms in the country changed, a need for more fuel efficient and less polluting four-stroke motorcycles suddenly came into being. However Suzuki at the time was globally known to produce two-stroke motorcycles and did not have strong R&D in the four-stroke department. All this led to the late introduction of the TVS-Suzuki Fiero in 2000 which was specifically developed for the Indian market.

At the time there was also an upcoming market for the low displacement performance motorcycles in India which can be related to the success of the Hero Honda CBZ. The Suzuki Fiero being a relatively powerful motorcycle in the segment, was well received. After the separation of TVS and Suzuki in 2001, TVS continued the production of the Fiero and its iterations under the name TVS Fiero, TVS Fiero FX

In 2005, to enter the 150 cm3 engine displacement category of performance motorcycles which was then dominated by the Bajaj Pulsar, TVS introduced the TVS Apache 150 IE-Surge, the first of the TVS Apache series of Motorcycles. It was a product of  TVS' own R&D which included many changes on their existing Fiero 147 cm3 Engine and as a result had an increased power output of 13.5 bhp from 12 bhp and better efficiency. There were also major improvements in design, suspension, brakes, frame and styling. The company claimed that the Apache had the highest power to weight ratio in its class and was the quickest for that reason.

The successors and current variants of the TVS Apache have engines based on the same platform but have significant design improvements such as an oversquare engine, 4- valves, balance shaft; technical advancements such as oil cooling, ram-air assist cooling (not to be confused with ram-air intake), fuel injection and performance improvements. However the TVS Apache RR 310 is an exception and is based on the BMW G310R.

In February 2019, an ABS equipped variant of the Apache RTR 160 4V was announced and on February 28, the ABS equipped version of the older Apache RTR 160 was launched.
In January 2020, a revision of the TVS Apache RR 310 was launched in India powered by a BSVI-compliant Engine.

Models

 Discontinued

Design and styling
The Apache was the first bike in India with a petal disc brake, which offers better heat dispersion thereby allowing fewer brake fades. The same bike introduced ABS in a 2 wheeler for the first time in India.

Comfort and handling
According to a 2007 review, since the bike was optimized for handling, the ride quality was on the stiff side. The Apache 180 introduced ABS to the lineup in 2011.

In 2020, BS6 compliant engines were released in all their line up which saw significant improvements in 200 and 310 models in terms of riding, handling, integrated tech

Awards
TVS Apache RTR 180 won Performance Bike Of The Year (2009) from Business Standard Motoring Awards. The TVS Apache RTR 200 4V has been awarded the NDTV Motorcycle of the Year up to 250cc for 2017.

References

External links 

Apache
Motorcycles introduced in 2006
Motorcycles of India